Keith Simpson may refer to:

Keith Simpson (pathologist) (1907–1985), British pathologist
Keith Simpson (politician) (born 1949), British politician, Conservative MP for Broadland
Keith Simpson (American football) (born 1956), former NFL safety
Keith Simpson (footballer) (1907–1964), Australian rules footballer who played with South Melbourne